Mama, I Want to Sing! is an American musical film written and directed by Charles Randolph-Wright, produced by Vision Films and CodeBlack Entertainment, and distributed by 20th Century Fox's Fox Faith division. The film is an adaptation of the off-Broadway gospel stage musical of the same name, written and produced by Vy Higginsen and Ken Wydro.

The film is based on the life story of Higginson's sister, Doris Troy, a preacher's daughter who sang in a church choir before being discovered by James Brown. Doris Troy's niece, Knoelle, who has played the star role in the off-Broadway production, makes her film debut in the movie in a principal role.

One of the executive producers announced via Twitter that the movie was completed in June 2009. The official movie trailer was released and premiered on September 22, 2009. It was set to premiere September 26, 2009 at the Urbanworld Film Festival in New York City, but due to technical issues it was canceled. The film was also slated to premiere on July 23, 2010, at the Faith Film Festival, but was also cancelled as well. In an October 2010 interview, Jeff Clanagan (CEO of Codeblack Entertainment) announced that the film was set for a January 14, 2011 release. However, it was pulled from the 10-15 theaters it was scheduled for at the last minute. In December 2011, a press release from Fox Home Entertainment states that Mama, I Want to Sing! would be a direct-to-video film. A new promo shot was also released. The film was released straight-to-DVD on February 14, 2012 following years of production hell and numerous delays.

This was the final film made by Fox Faith after it was dissolved.

Plot 
Amara Winter (Ciara), a beautiful and charismatic young singer, is on the verge of stardom. Raised in the church by her father, Reverend Dr. Kenneth Winter (Marvin Winans) and mother, Lillian Winter (Lynn Whitfield), Amara and her younger brother Luke (Kevin Phillips) have a very strong bond. After her father's untimely death, her mother is thrust into the limelight in the role as preacher, a daring move that ultimately catapults her to the top of the gospel world. Paralleling her mother's success, Amara soon becomes a huge star in her own right, taking the R&B world by storm.

Conflict begins to ensue when her mother is confronted with, and unequivocally disapproves of, Amara's secular music and videos. Amara must learn to pursue her dreams while navigating the often treacherous world of celebrity and striving to remain true to herself and family. Amara and her mother must work through their differences realizing that their journeys are not quite so different after all.

Cast 
 Ciara as Doris Winter / Amara
Mariah Roberson as Young Doris Winter
 Lynn Whitfield as Dr. Lillian Winter, Doris' Mother
 Marvin Winans as Reverend Winter, Doris' Father
 Patti LaBelle as Sister Carrie
 Billy Zane as Dillan, Doris' Producer
 Hill Harper as Jeff Andrews, Doris' Manager
 Kim Porter as Tara
 Ben Vereen as Horace Payne
 Ava Santana as Dr. Winter's Assistant
 Kevin Phillips as Luke Winter, Amara's Brother
Michael Josiah Foster as Young Luke Winter
 Alexandra Cheron as Kimberly
 Juanita Bynum as Beverly
 Shonda Farr as Holly
 Courtney Shay Young as Doris  Wardrobe
 Geraldine Glenn as Still Photographer
 Marissa D'Onofrio as Sienna
 Gospel For Teens Choir

Production
Tarralyn Ramsey and Paris Bennett auditioned for the role of Amara before CodeBlack Entertainment offered the role to Ciara.  Vy Higginsen, the original playwright for the off-Broadway production of "Mama, I Want to Sing!", assisted Charles Randolph-Wright with the script. Shalyric Self was set to portray the younger version of Amara, but due to contract issues, she was replaced by Mariah Roberson. The film was shown on BET for the first time on August 19, 2012.

Songs
Mama I Want To Sing: The Soundtrack was released on January 18, 2011.

Tug of War | Deitrick Haddon		
Walk Around Heaven | Patti LaBelle				
I Will | Paris Bennett				
Living Not in Vain | Fred Hammond feat. Smokie Norful				
Mama, I Want to Sing! | Kierra Kiki Sheard				
Be Grateful | Fred Hammond feat. Cynthia Simon				
U Got Me Through | 21:03 feat. J Moss				
For Me	| B.R.I.G.G. feat. Eric Griggs			
I'm Gonna Serve the Lord | Johnny B. Williams				
Jus' 1 of Dem Days | Irocc Williams				
Sick-n-Tired | Karen Clark Sheard feat. Kierra Kiki Sheard				
Not Created to Fall | Desiree Coleman

See also
List of black films of the 2010s

References

External links 
 
 

2012 films
Films about Christianity
2010s musical drama films
African-American musical drama films
Films about music and musicians
American films based on plays
African-American films
Films based on musicals
2012 drama films
2010s English-language films
2010s American films